Crescent Springs is a home rule-class city in Kenton County, Kentucky, United States. The population was 3,801 at the 2010 census.

Geography
Crescent Springs is located at  (39.052711, -84.577058).

History
Originally a stop on the Cincinnati Southern Railroad, the name Crescent Springs could refer to either the shape of the tracks crossing through the community or to New Orleans's nickname "the Crescent City" after its shape beside the Mississippi River. (New Orleans was the southern terminus of the Cincinnati Southern, from which it was sometimes known as the "Queen and Crescent Railroad".)

In 1930, the International Labor Defense alleged that Crescent Springs was a sundown town where African Americans were not allowed to reside.

Demographics

As of the census of 2000, there were 3,931 people, 1,638 households, and 1,020 families residing in the city. The racial makeup of the city was 95.80% White, 1.37% African American, 0.05% Native American, 1.78% Asian, 0.03% Pacific Islander, 0.13% from other races, and 0.84% from two or more races. Hispanic or Latino of any race were 0.89% of the population.

There were 1,638 households, out of which 33.5% had children under the age of 18 living with them, 44.6% were married couples living together, 12.6% had a female householder with no husband present, and 37.7% were non-families. 29.9% of all households were made up of individuals, and 7.6% had someone living alone who was 65 years of age or older. The average household size was 2.40 and the average family size was 3.00.

In the city, the population was spread out, with 26.4% under the age of 18, 10.1% from 18 to 24, 34.7% from 25 to 44, 20.0% from 45 to 64, and 8.8% who were 65 years of age or older. The median age was 32 years. For every 100 females, there were 94.3 males. For every 100 females age 18 and over, there were 91.2 males.

The median income for a household in the city was $41,429, and the median income for a family was $50,573. Males had a median income of $42,500 versus $30,708 for females. The per capita income for the city was $24,891. About 5.2% of families and 7.1% of the population were below the poverty line, including 7.8% of those under age 18 and 2.6% of those age 65 or over.

References

External links
  City of Crescent Springs Official Website
 Historical Texts and Images of Crescent Springs, Kentucky

Cities in Kentucky
Cities in Kenton County, Kentucky
Sundown towns in Kentucky